Philadelphia FIGHT (FIGHT) is a Philadelphia AIDS service organization that provides primary care, consumer education, advocacy and research. FIGHT was formed as a partnership of individuals living with HIV & AIDS and clinicians.

FIGHT is a non-profit organization, which is in part funded by the AIDS Activities Coordinating Office of Philadelphia.

About

Mission
"Philadelphia FIGHT is a comprehensive AIDS Service Organization providing state of the art, culturally competent HIV primary care, consumer education, advocacy, social services, outreach to people living with HIV and to those who are at high risk, and access to the most advanced clinical research. Our goal and hope is to end the AIDS epidemic within the lifetime of those currently living with HIV."

History 
FIGHT was founded in 1990.

Programs 
 AIDS Library provides access to information on treatments, nutrition, and history of the pandemic, and referrals to regional and national resources.
 Critical Path AIDS Project was founded by Kiyoshi Kuromiya in 1987. Today FIGHT's program provides Internet access and digital literacy training to low-income people.
 Jonathan Lax Immune Disorders Treatments Center provides clinical care to people with HIV/AIDS. Clinicians also conduct research to test potential therapies for HIV/AIDS.
 Project TEACH (Treatment Education Activists Combating HIV) trains people living with HIV to act as community and peer educators, especially in low-income areas and communities of color.
 Youth Health Empowerment Project (Y-HEP) was founded in 1994 to reduce the spread of HIV and other sexually transmitted infections.

Events
 AIDS Education Month: recognized every June, FIGHT organizes summits about HIV prevention as well as youth, faith, and prison issues. FIGHT also organizes citywide testing for National HIV Testing Day on June 27 with other local agencies, including: ActionAIDS, GALAEI, and the Mazzoni Center.

See also
 Kiyoshi Kuromiya
 Gloria Casarez

References

External links
 Philadelphia FIGHT Website
 Critical Path Project (Archived)

HIV/AIDS prevention organizations
Organizations established in 1986
Non-profit organizations based in Philadelphia
Medical and health organizations based in Pennsylvania
HIV/AIDS activism
1986 establishments in Pennsylvania